Cistus horrens is a shrubby species of flowering plant in the family Cistaceae, with purple to pink flowers. It is endemic to Gran Canaria in the Canary Islands. First described as a species in 2004, it was previously identified as Cistus symphytifolius, which it resembles.

Description
Cistus horrens generally resembles the more widespread Cistus symphytifolius. Differences include young branches covered with simple hairs; leaf blades grayer and shorter, densely covered with simple, glandular and stellate hairs on the upper surface and with longer simple hairs on the lower surface, with glandular hairs only on the nerves; sepals densely covered with simple hairs; and smaller fruiting capsules with fewer seeds. The leaves are elliptical to lanceolate, stalked (petiolate) and have netted (reticulate) veins. The stigmas are longer than the stamens.

Taxonomy and phylogeny
Cistus horrens was first described as a new species by Jean-Pierre Demoly in 2004; it had previously been treated as C. symphytifolius. The specific epithet horrens is Latin for "standing erect, bristling".

A 2011 molecular phylogenetic study placed C. horrens as a member of the purple and pink flowered clade (PPC) of Cistus species, along with some other Canary Island endemics (Cistus asper, Cistus chinamadensis, Cistus ocreatus, and Cistus symphytifolius).

Distribution and habitat
Cistus horrens is endemic to Gran Canaria in the Canary Islands, being found in the south-west sector of the island.

References

horrens
Plants described in 2004
Flora of the Canary Islands